Matheolus Perusinus (Mattheolus de Perusio, Mattiolo Mattioli, Matthiolus de Matthiolis, Matthiolus de Matthiolis) (died 1480) was a professor of philosophy and medicine.  He was a native of Perugia (hence his name), and died at Padua.

He was the tutor of Hartmann Schedel and the author of a work on human memory (Tractatus Artis Memorativæ).

References

External links
Mattioli, Mattiolo

15th-century Italian physicians
People from Perugia
1480 deaths
Italian Renaissance humanists
Year of birth unknown
15th-century Italian writers